Neil Oliver (born 21 February 1967) is a British television presenter, archaeologist, historian and author. He has presented several documentary series on archaeology and history, including A History of Scotland, Vikings, and Coast. He is also an author of popular history books and historical fiction.

He was the president of the National Trust for Scotland from 2017 to 2020.

Early life and education
Oliver was born in Renfrew and raised in Ayr and Dumfries where he attended Dumfries Academy and then the University of Glasgow. He obtained an MA (Hons) in archaeology and then worked as a freelance archaeologist, before training as a journalist.

Television career

Oliver first appeared on television in the 2002 BBC Two series Two Men in a Trench, in which he and archaeologist Tony Pollard visited historic British battlefields. He was also a co-author of the two books accompanying the series. In 2006, he presented The Face of Britain for Channel 4 and Scotland's History: The Top Ten for the BBC. Early in his career he also appeared on The One Show and Time Team.

Oliver was a co-presenter of the first series of Coast in 2005, and replaced Nicholas Crane as the show's main presenter for the second, third, fourth, and fifth series. He also presented Coast Australia (2013) and Coast New Zealand (2016).

From 2006 to 2018 Oliver presented a number of history documentaries for the BBC, including A History of Scotland (2008) and Sacred Wonders of Britain (2013). In 2012, he wrote and presented Vikings, a three-part series on the Vikings.

In April 2021, Oliver was announced as a presenter for GB News. He hosts a weekly current affairs and interview programme on the channel.

Politics
In 2014, Oliver stated that he was "proud of Britain" ahead of the Scottish independence referendum, saying that "this kind of internecine squabbling puts my teeth on edge. I would rather that it would just go away — or that it had never happened" and that he "liked the status quo". When he was appointed President of the National Trust for Scotland, thousands signed petitions calling on him to resign. In 2020, Oliver reasserted his opposition to Scottish independence, describing the uncertainty caused by the prospect of a second referendum as a "cancerous presence" and saying that "I'm a British citizen, that's how I see myself. Not in an argumentative way, I don't see that I should have to cede my right to understand myself as I am to some politician."

Commenting on the British government's response to the coronavirus pandemic in 2021, Oliver said, "Lockdown is the biggest single mistake in world history".  He also criticised the drive to vaccinate children in the UK against COVID-19, and likened the fight against government anti-COVID measures to the fight against Nazi Germany.

Oliver's opposition to coronavirus restrictions led to his leaving the unionist campaign group These Islands. Tom Holland, an advisory board member of These Islands, said that Oliver's "current focus was not compatible with our own".

On GB News, Oliver spoke on the subject of the 2022 Russian invasion of Ukraine, saying "I'll be honest. I don't know what's happening in Ukraine. I don't understand it either" and "I do know that I don't trust Putin, or our government, or Europe's governments, or the governments of North America either. I certainly don't trust any of them to tell the truth".

During a monologue delivered on his GB News programme on 4 February 2023, Oliver spoke of a "silent war" waged by generations of politicians in order to take "total control of the people" and impose "one-world government".  According to The Guardian, the monologue apparently referred to Silent Weapons for Quiet Wars, an alleged conspiracy theory document. The Board of Deputies of British Jews and the All-Party Parliamentary Group against Antisemitism both issued statements calling on GB News to stop indulging antisemitic conspiracy theories.

Personal life
Oliver lives in Stirling with his wife, three children and two Irish Wolfhounds. He is a patron of the Association of Lighthouse Keepers.

In July 2015 he was awarded an Honorary Doctorate of Letters by the University of Glasgow, having previously received the same degree in November 2011 from the University of Abertay Dundee.

Works

Television

Books
 The Story of the World in 100 Moments (2021)
 Wisdom of the Ancients (2020)
 The Story of the British Isles in 100 Places (2018)
 Master of Shadows (2015)
 Vikings (2012)
 A History of Ancient Britain (2011)
 A History of Scotland (2009)
 Amazing Tales for Making Men Out of Boys (2008)
 Coast from the Air (2007)
 Not Forgotten (2006)
 Castles and Forts (with Simon Adams and Tony Pollard) (2006)
 Two Men in a Trench II: Uncovering the Secrets of British Battlefields (with Tony Pollard) (2003)
 Two Men in a Trench: Battlefield Archaeology – The Key to Unlocking the Past (with Tony Pollard) (2002)

References

External links

 
 "My schooldays"  at Scotsman.com
 
 

1967 births
Living people
Alumni of the University of Glasgow
People educated at Dumfries Academy
People from South Ayrshire
Scottish archaeologists
Scottish television presenters
British conspiracy theorists
GB News newsreaders and journalists